The common shovelnose ray, giant shovelnose ray or giant guitarfish (Glaucostegus typus) is a species of fish in the Rhinobatidae family found in the central Indo-Pacific, ranging from India to the East China Sea, Solomon Islands and northern Australia. It is found in shallow coastal areas to a depth of at least , including mangrove, estuaries and reportedly also in freshwaters.

This species has been tested for colour vision using choice experiments that control for brightness. It was the first rigorous behavioural evidence for colour vision in any elasmobranch.

References

common shovelnose ray
common shovelnose ray
Taxonomy articles created by Polbot